Kurian John Melamparambil is an Indian philanthropist, industrialist and writer from Kerala. He is the founder and chief promoter of Melam Group of Companies and the Melam Foundation. With his own generated funds, he has provided free medical treatment to over 158,000 poor patients through 1050 hospitals. He was honoured by the Government of India, in 2010, for his services to the social cause, with the fourth highest civilian award, the Padma Shri.

Background

Kurian John Melamparambil was born on 14 May 1954 as the second son of Late John V. Melamparambil (Kunju Kunju) and Leelamma into the 'Melamparambil', a traditional business family of Tiruvalla, a central Kerala town. His early childhood and schooling days, both primary and senior level, were at M.G.M High School, Tiruvalla where he spent time with the family members and imbibed great values from the family elders. After schooling, he joined Pre-degree course in Mar Thoma College(1970–72) and from Mar Ivanios College, Thiruvananthapuram he completed his Graduation and obtained a Bachelor of Arts degree majoring in Economics (1972–75). He then moved to the Indore School of Social Work, Indore and completed his Post Graduate Degreein social work (MSW) in 1978.

After his Post Graduation, he joined as the Head of personnel & Administration division in the Cochin unit of Malayala Manorama the largest Malayalam daily.

Philanthropy
He entered into business in order to generate funds for carrying out charitable activities.

All applicants for medical assistance from the Melam foundation are met and interviewed before disbursement of any assistance. He personally meets each patient/relative, however large the turnout is. He also provides food on those days to the patients and their relatives.

It is a wholly private activity with no Government funds or public funds or involvement. 48 MP's (both Lok Sabha and Rajya Sabha) from the State of Kerala, 138 MLA's out of 140 from the Kerala Legislative Assembly, and from the border district of Tamil Nadu and Karnataka, and around 18,000 Councilors/Panchayath members in Kerala have already participated in the selection process.

Kurian John Melamparambil's work has resulted in establishing a network of more than 1025 hospitals across the state for providing specialized treatment to the sponsored patients within a 30 days credit period for reimbursement from him.

Awards and recognitions

Kurian John Melamparambil has been honoured with several awards and recognitions during his career.

 Padma Shri – 2010
Outstanding Entrepreneur of the Year 1997 – the Ministry of Commerce and Industry, Government of India.
Times of India Excellence in Business Award – Times of India Group – 2009
Outstanding National award in Exports – the Ministry of Commerce and Industry, Government of India – 1993–94, 1994–95, 1995–96 and 1996–97
Baroda Sun Lifetime Achievement National Award -2015 (Cash award of Rs. 5  lakhs) for excellence in Social Service from Bank of Baroda.
For the Sake of Honor Award – the Rotary Club International – 2011
 Personality Brand of Kerala Award 2019 instituted by Samrambham Business Magazine
 Bright Star Recognition Award 2020 from Kidney Warriors Foundation and Kerala Kidney Foundation
 Dr. B. R. Ambedkar Healthcare Excellence Award 2020, Karnataka for the outstanding service in the field of Healthcare
 Award of Excellence 2020 from Global Kidney Foundation, UK for dedicated service to poor patients
 Goldstar Millennium Award – Global Economic Council, New Delhi
 Rashtriya Ratan Award – 1999
 Outstanding Entrepreneur of the Year – 1998 – Berchmans Institute of Management Studies, M G University, Kottayam, Kerala
 Gold Star Award – The Institute of Economic Studies, New Delhi – 1994
 Bharat Vikas Excellence Award – the Council for National Development, New Delhi – 1997
 Niryat Ratan Award – Indian Council for Small and Medium Exporters, New Delhi – 1994
 Udyog Ratna Award – the Institute of Economic Studies, New Delhi.
 International Gold Star Award – Business Initiative Directions, Spain – 2007 a vanity award
 Vocational Excellence Award – Rotary Club, Alappuzha – 2007
 Humanitarian Millennium Award – International YMCA – South West Region
 Excellence Award – Lions Club International – 2003 and 2004
 Sree Gokulam Excellence Award – 2003
 Outstanding Social Worker Award – Sri Sankaracharya Educational Trust, Kaladi, Kerala
 Janaseva Deshiya Puraskaram – Mahatma Gandhi International Charities Trust, Kerala – 2003
 JCI Award – Indian Junior Chamber- 1994
 Athuraseva Ratnam Award – Gandhibhavan International Trust – 2008
 Adv. Mammen Mathai MLA Award – Merchant's Association, Kochi – 2009
 Rhema Foundation International Award – Rhema Foundation International – 2010
 Karmakeerthi Puraskaram – Kalanidhi Centre for Arts, Culture and Research, Trivandrum – 2012
 Voice of Gulf Returnees Excellence Award – 2012
 Best Citizens of India Award – the Best Citizens of India, New Delhi – 1998
Cherian Palathara Award- 2011 from Cherian Palathra Foundation for outstanding Entrepreneurship and Corporate Social Responsibility.
CSR Award 2012 - from Bharata Mata Institute of Management "Xlencia 12" for the exemplary performance in the field of social work through business
Business Excellence Award -2015 for consistent C.S.R initiative from D.C. Media, D.C. Books.
Georgian Award 2016 from St. George Orthodox Cathedral, Pandalam for outstanding social work.

Published works
Melamparambil has published a few memoirs, which narrates his life through business, spirituality, and charity.

 

 "Yesu ente vazhikatti", spiritual memoirs of Kurian John Melamparambil.
 "Zero to Zenith" - Start-Up story published by Penguin Random House 2017.

References

External links

Kurian John Melamparambil at Penguin India

Living people
Recipients of the Padma Shri in social work
Malayali people
People from Thiruvalla
Indian humanitarians
Businesspeople from Kerala
1954 births